is the 15th single by Japanese music trio Candies. Written by Makoto Kitajō and Juichi Sase, the single was released on July 21, 1977. The song appeared on their 1977 album Candy Label.

The song peaked at No. 5 on Oricon's singles chart and sold over 298,000 copies.

Track listing

Chart positions

Cute Version

Hello! Project girl group Cute released their version of "Shochū Omimai Mōshiagemasu" as their ninth single on July 1, 2009. It was released in a normal CD-only edition, and a limited edition with a bonus DVD. The song was used as the Japan Post Service Company's "Summer Greetings 2009" image song.

The single peaked at No. 5 in the Oricon Weekly Singles Chart.

Track listing

Charts

Other cover versions
 Japanese girl group SweetS also released a cover of this song in 2004.

References

External links 
Candies
 
 

Cute
"Shochū Omimai Mōshiagemasu" by Cute at the Up-Front Works discography (Japanese)
"Shochū Omimai Mōshiagemasu" by Cute at the Hello! Project official discography (Japanese)

1977 singles
1977 songs
2009 singles
Japanese-language songs
Candies (group) songs
Cute (Japanese idol group) songs
Song recordings produced by Tsunku
Sony Music Entertainment Japan singles
Zetima Records singles